Victor van Straelen (14 June 1889 – 29 February 1964) was a Belgian conservationist, palaeontologist and carcinologist.

Van Straelen was born in Antwerp on 14 June 1889, and worked chiefly as a palaeontologist until his retirement in 1954.

He was  director of the Royal Belgian Institute of Natural Sciences from 1925 to 1954. He was the first president of the Charles Darwin Foundation from its foundation in 1959 until his death in 1964.

He was awarded a silver Darwin-Wallace Medal by the Linnean Society of London in 1958.

References

Further reading

1889 births
1964 deaths
Scientists from Antwerp
Belgian paleontologists
Belgian conservationists
Belgian carcinologists
20th-century Belgian zoologists